The Roger Pryor Pioneer Backcountry is a  area of private land that is managed by the Missouri Department of Natural Resources for hiking and backpacking by the public.  The land is part of the largest private forest in the state, the Pioneer Forest, owned by the L-A-D Foundation, an endowment of the late Missouri timber magnate, conservationist, and philanthropist Leo Drey (1917–2015).

Two significant wilderness areas are included in the managed area: the Current River Natural Area which contains 400-year-old trees, and the Pioneer Natural Area adjacent to the Current River, which is home to old-growth cedar and hardwood trees.

An additional trail under construction, the Current River Trail, will eventually connect Round Spring, a few miles west of the backcountry area, to the Brushy Creek Trail.

References

External links
Roger Pryor Pioneer Backcountry Missouri Department of Natural Resources 
Roger Pryor Pioneer Backcountry L-A-D Foundation

State parks of Missouri
Protected areas established in 2001
Protected areas of Shannon County, Missouri